Shepherd's Bridge Halt railway station was on the Belfast and County Down Railway which ran from Belfast to Newcastle, County Down in Northern Ireland.

History

The station was opened by the Belfast and County Down Railway in October 1931.

The station closed to passengers on 24 April 1950, by which time it had been taken over by the Ulster Transport Authority.

References 

 
 
 

Disused railway stations in County Down
Railway stations opened in 1931
Railway stations closed in 1950
1931 establishments in Northern Ireland
1950 disestablishments in Northern Ireland
Railway stations in Northern Ireland opened in the 20th century